Pézènes-les-Mines (Languedocien: Pesena de las Minas) is a commune in the Hérault department in the Occitanie region in southern France. Until 1926, the commune was known simply as Pézènes; the name change was authorised by government decree.

On the edge of the village is the Château de Pézènes, a feudal castle, dominating the site from a rocky ridge. It has been listed since 1981 as a monument historique by the French Ministry of Culture.

Population

See also
 Castles in Hérault
Communes of the Hérault department

References

Communes of Hérault